Outside the Law is a 1937  Argentine thriller film directed and written by Manuel Romero. The film premiered on 12 May 1940 in the United States. The film starred José Gola, Luis Arata, Roberto Blanco, and Irma Córdoba

It was selected as the tenth greatest Argentine film of all time in a poll conducted by the Museo del Cine Pablo Ducrós Hicken in 1977.

Plot 
Juan Robles, the son of a police superintendent, becomes involved in crime and is sentenced to a prison term. After being released, he falls in love with Emilia, a young single mother who rejects him. Obsessed with the woman, Juan and some fellow gangsters kidnap Emilia's little daughter. Pedro Robles, his father, ask his superiors to take the case himself in order to confront his deranged son.

Cast
Luis Arata as Pedro Robles
José Gola as  Juan Robles
Irma Córdoba as Emilia
Susy Derqui as Flora
María Esther Buschiazzo as  Juan Robles' mother
Marcos Caplán as  Agapito
Pedro Maratea as Enrique Varela
Marcelo Ruggero as Chichilo
Martín Zabalúa as Chief of Police
María Vitaliani as Chichilo's wife
Pedro Laxalt as Roberto Achával
Roberto Blanco as Ñato
Rayito de Sol as Susana Achával
Gerardo Rodríguez as Turkish
Jorge Lanza as Giménez
Malisa Zini as Babysitter (uncredited)

References

External links

1937 films
1930s Spanish-language films
Argentine black-and-white films
Films directed by Manuel Romero
1930s crime thriller films
Argentine crime thriller films
1930s Argentine films